Attimis is a comune (municipality) in the Province of Udine in the Italian region Friuli-Venezia Giulia, located about  northwest of Trieste and about  northeast of Udine.

Attimis borders the following municipalities: Faedis, Nimis, Povoletto, Taipana.

Main sights
Attimis is home to a medieval archaeological museum.

People
The Attems noble family originates from the Fortress of Attimis.

Puerto Rican songwriter and musician Tony Croatto was born in Attimis.

References

External links

 Official website

Cities and towns in Friuli-Venezia Giulia
Articles which contain graphical timelines